The Place des Victoires is a circular place in Paris, located a short distance northeast from the Palais Royal and straddling the border between the 1st and the 2nd arrondissements. The Place des Victoires is at the confluence of six streets: Rue de la Feuillade, Rue Vide Gousset, Rue d'Aboukir, Rue Étienne Marcel, Rue Croix-des-Petits-Champs, and Rue Catinat.

History
At the center of the Place des Victoires is an equestrian monument in honor of King Louis XIV, celebrating the  Treaties of Nijmegen concluded in 1678-79. A marshal of France, François de la Feuillade, vicomte d'Aubusson, on his own speculative initiative, demolished the old private mansions on the site. Feuillade's project was soon taken over by the Bâtiments du Roi, a department attached to the king's household, and the royal architect, Jules Hardouin Mansart, was entrusted with redesigning a grander complex of buildings, still in the form of a ring of private houses, to accommodate a majestic statue of the triumphant king.

Hardouin-Mansart's conception

Hardouin-Mansart's design, of 1685, articulated the square's unified façades according to a formula utilised in some Parisian hôtels particuliers,  (palatial private homes). Mansart chose colossal pilasters linking two floors, standing on a high arcaded base with rustication of the pilasters; the façades were capped with sloping slate "mansard roofs", punctuated by dormer windows. However, because the building work was incomplete at the time of the unveiling of the monument, the envisioned façades were painted on canvas. By 1692, the Place des Victoires was pierced by six streets, and the circular plan functioned as a flexible joint to harmonize their various axes.

Desjardins sculpture

The original statue, of Louis XIV crowned by Victory and trampling Cerberus underfoot, in gilt bronze, stood on a high square pedestal with bas-relief panels and effusively flattering inscriptions; dejected bronze figures were seated at the corners. The sculptor was Martin Desjardins, part of the team that was working cooperatively at the Château of Versailles and its gardens.

Louis XIV's reversals
Louis permanently abandoned Paris in 1682, and his imperial ambitions in Europe were deflated by subsequent wars; the Treaty of Ryswick of 1697 was termed "a humiliating disaster for the king" by the military architect Vauban. "During the course of the eighteenth century," Rochelle Ziskin has noted, "critics would suggest that the arrogance of representation at the Place des Victoires had serious political consequences and may have been a factor in provoking war." The grandiose memorial that had begun to embarrass Louis XIV himself would eventually be destroyed in 1792, during the French Revolution.

Modern times
In 1793, the Place was renamed Place des Victoires-Nationaux (National Victories Square), and a wooden pyramid was erected on the site of the destroyed statue. In 1810, under the rule of Napoléon I, a nude statue of the General Louis Desaix replaced the pyramid. However, following the abdication of Napoléon, the statue was taken down and its metal was used to create a new statue of Henry IV on the nearby Pont Neuf.

In 1828, the restored Bourbon king, Charles X, commissioned the current equestrian statue, which was sculpted by François Joseph Bosio in imitation of the famous Bronze Horseman. Louis XIV, dressed as a Roman emperor, sits on a proud horse rearing on its hind legs. An iron fence encircles the twelve-meter-high monument.

Square today

The area surrounding the Place des Victoires is now an upmarket neighborhood. Fashion designers Kenzo and Cacharel have boutiques there, as have the ready-to-wear chains Maje, and Zadig et Voltaire. The German Forum for Art History (Deutsches Forum für Kunstgeschichte) is on the Place and the French Institut national d'histoire de l'art is in nearby Galerie Colbert.

Metro station
The Place des Victoires is:
 It is served by lines 3, 4, 7, and 14.

Notes

External links
 

Monuments and memorials in Paris
Victoires
1685 establishments in France
Buildings and structures in the 1st arrondissement of Paris
Buildings and structures in the 2nd arrondissement of Paris